Defence Research and Development Laboratory (DRDL) is an Indian missile development laboratory, part of the Defence Research and Development Organization (DRDO). Their charter is centered on the design, development, and flight evaluation of various types of missile systems for the Indian armed forces. The organization's vision statement reads:

"Be a design and development house for missile based weapon systems required for tactical applications from multiple platforms."

Its stated mission is to:

"Develop the state of the art infrastructure and technologies required for different classes of missiles. Transfer the technology to production agency for guided missile products."

History 
In 1958, the government of India constituted a team of Indian engineers, mostly from the Indian Ordnance Factories- called the Special Weapons Development Team - to research guided missile weapons development. It was founded by S. P. Chakravarti, the father of Electronics and Telecommunication engineering in India, who also founded DLRL and LRDE. This team was later expanded into DRDL, a full-fledged laboratory, in June 1961, at the campus of Defence Science Centre, Delhi. It later shifted to Hyderabad after the state government granted them the former Nizam's army barracks. This was the genesis of the Defence Research and Development Laboratory (DRDL), under the Defence Research and Development Organisation (DRDO).

References 

Defence Research and Development Organisation laboratories
Research and development in India
Research institutes established in 1961
1961 establishments in Delhi